James C. McLean (born May 18, 1950) is a leading American golf instructor. He is known for coining the phrase “X-Factor”, observing that the greater the differential between the hips and shoulders at the top of the swing, the more power the golfer can create. McLean is CEO of the Jim McLean Golf School, which operates from eight locations.

Amateur career
McLean was Washington State Junior Champion two times. He also won the Pacific Northwest Amateur three times. He also won The Seattle Amateur and The 4 States Amateur in Texarkana, Texas in 1972. McLean was an All-American at the University of Houston where he played for the golf team from 1969 to 1973. He had three college victories. He qualified for the U.S. Junior Amateur and the U.S. Amateur three times. His best result at the U.S. Amateur was fourth in 1971. McLean played in the 1972 Masters Tournament as an amateur, finishing tied for 43rd. He won the Pacific Coast Amateur in 1971 and was named first alternate to the U.S. Amateur World Cup team in 1972. McLean won 12 USGA medals for the U.S. Junior, U.S. Amateur, U.S. Open, and U.S. Senior Open.

Professional career
McLean was a touring professional golfer for two years. He qualified for ten national club professional events, won the Westchester PGA Championship in the PGA Met Section, and won the National Skins Game held in Palm Springs, California. His first club professional position was as an assistant at Westchester Country Club. McLean was the director of golf at Sunningdale Country Club in Greenville, New York; Quaker Ridge Golf Club in Scarsdale, New York; Tamarisk Country Club in Rancho Mirage, California; Sleepy Hollow CC in Westchester, New York; and The Doral Golf Resort and Spa in Miami, Florida. McLean became a member of the South Florida PGA Hall of Fame in 2017 and the Miami Sports Hall of Fame in 2008. The PGA of America gave McLean the PGA National Player Development award in 2021.

Broadcasting
McLean has been a golf analyst for CNBC for the PGA Champions Tour and was an analyst for NBC for the 1991 Ryder Cup Matches. He has been the co-host of Golf School on SiriusXM for 6 years and also an analyst for the major championships on Sirius XM PGA Tour Radio.

Teaching
In 1991, McLean became the Director of Golf at Doral Resort in Miami, Florida (now named Trump National Doral). McLean started to run golf schools in the winter at Doral. In 1993, he established The Jim McLean Golf School. He has taught Tom Kite, Cristie Kerr, Liselotte Neumann, Lexi Thompson, Keegan Bradley, and Gary Woodland, all of whom have won professional major championships. Over 200 of his former assistants have become club head professionals or directors of instruction.

In 2017, McLean announced the relocation of the headquarters to the Miami Biltmore Hotel. He has worked with Lucy Li, Ben Crenshaw, Curtis Strange, Sergio García, and Gary Player among others.

He pioneered the use of video for golf instruction and was one of the first adopters of radar technology used in swing analysis tools like TrackMan. McLean's teaching philosophy is based on position teaching using detailed parameters, safety zones, and what he calls "The Powerline." He is also known for The X-Factor and The X-Factor Stretch.

Books and videos 
 The Eight Step Swing, .
 The Putter’s Pocket Companion, 
 The Power Game Pocket Companion,  
 Ben Hogan. The Golf Swing,  
 The Wedge Game Pocket Companion,  
 The Jim McLean Golf Digest Ultimate Drill Book,  
 Golf Digest’s The Drill System for Better Golf,  
 The X-Factor,  
 The Slot Swing,  
 Golf School,  
 The 3 Scoring Clubs,  
 The Complete Idiot’s Guide to the Short Game,  
 The Jim McLean System: Your Swing Solution,  
 The Ultimate Guide to Trackman Swing Analysis (With Adam Kolloff) (2015).
 18 Ways to Become the Undisputed #1 Business in Your Category.
 Build Your Swing. 2020.
 Power Golf Pocket Companion. 2020.
 Short Game Pocket Companion. 2020.

Recognition 
McLean was inducted into the Pacific Northwest Golf Association Hall of Fame in 2003. He is a member of the Pacific Northwest Hall of Fame, the MET PGA Hall of Fame, the South Florida PGA Hall of Fame, the Miami Sports Hall of Fame, and the Long Island Hall of Fame. He has consistently been recognized as a leading golf teacher and was inducted into the World Teachers Hall of Fame.

McLean has won the following PGA Awards:
 1986 Metropolitan Teacher of the Year
 1987 Metropolitan Horton Smith Award
 1994 National PGA Teacher of the Year
 1996 South Florida Teacher of the Year
 1998 South Florida Teacher of the Year
 2000 South Florida Junior Leader Award
 Golf Magazine: Top 100 Teachers in America
 Golf Digest: Ranked #3 Teacher in America for 25 years
 South Florida PGA Professional Development Award 2019
 PGA of America Professional Development National Award 2020
"The Golf Swing: Ben Hogan" video has won 6 awards (3 Aurora awards in 2000 and 3 Telly awards in 2001).

Sports Illustrated listed The Eight-Step Swing as one of the top golf books of the 20th Century.

Amateur wins
1969 Pacific Northwest Amateur
1971 Pacific Coast Amateur, Pacific Northwest Amateur
1972 Pacific Northwest Amateur, Texas Amateur, Oklahoma Amateur, Arkansas Amateur, Louisiana Amateur

Professional wins
1970 Northwest Open (as an amateur)
1987 Westchester PGA Championship

References

American male golfers
American golf instructors
Houston Cougars men's golfers
1950 births
Living people